Nizhneangarsk Airport  is an airport in Russia located 4 km northeast of Nizhneangarsk and 26 km northeast of Severobaykalsk.  It is located at the northern tip of Lake Baikal.  It handles small transport aircraft and has a well-maintained runway.

Airlines and destinations

Accidents and incidents
On 27 June 2019, Angara Airlines Flight 200 overran the runway on landing and collided with a building. Two of the 47 people on board were killed.

References

Airports in Buryatia
Airports built in the Soviet Union